Benedicte Iversen Håland (born 10 February 1998) is a Norwegian professional footballer who plays as a goalkeeper for Scottish Women's Premier League Hibernian W.F.C. 

Håland has played for the Norwegian national team U17 and U19.

Career statistics 
As of 30 September 2021

Club career 
Håland was born in Norway and started her professional career at Arna-Bjørnar. She then spent a short time at Sandviken, which included a spell on loan to Fyllingsdalen. Håland agreed a one-year contract with Swiss Women's Super League club Lugano in January 2020, before moving to Bristol City of the FA WSL in September 2020. After finishing the season at the bottom of the table, Bristol City were relegated. Straight off the back of the completion of the FA WSL season, Håland joined Icelandic top league team UMF Selfoss. She spent the second half of the 2021-2022 season at Italian side Hellas Verona. In May 2022, it was announced that Benedicte would join the Scottish side Hibernian W.F.C.

International career 
Håland was selected to train with the Norwegian under-17 national team in 2014. She played 3 matches and attended the UEFA Women's U17 EURO in Iceland in the summer of 2015. She was also selected for the U19 team and played 4 matches.

References

External links 
 Benedicte Håland at Soccerway
Benedicte Håland Bristol City profile
Benedicte Håland at Norwegian Football Federation (NFF) (in Norwegian)

1998 births
Living people
Women's association football goalkeepers
Bristol City W.F.C. players
Norwegian women's footballers
Women's Super League players
Expatriate women's footballers in England
Norwegian expatriate sportspeople in England
Norwegian expatriate sportspeople in Switzerland
SK Brann Kvinner players
Arna-Bjørnar players
Toppserien players
FF Lugano 1976 players
Swiss Women's Super League players
Norwegian expatriate sportspeople in Italy
Norwegian expatriate sportspeople in Iceland
Selfoss women's football players
Expatriate women's footballers in Iceland
Expatriate women's footballers in Italy
Expatriate women's footballers in Switzerland
Hellas Verona Women players